The  is a Japanese railway line operated by East Japan Railway Company (JR East) which connects Yahiko Station in the village of Yahiko and Higashi-Sanjō Station in the city of Sanjo, both in Niigata Prefecture. The line shares its name with both Yahiko Village and nearby Mt. Yahiko.

Services
All trains on the line operate as local services stopping at all stations. Most services run between Yahiko and Yoshida, and Yoshida and Higashi-Sanjō. A few services run the full length of the line from Yahiko to Higashi-Sanjō, and one service in the mornings in both directions runs through to the Echigo Line toward . There is an hourly service in the mornings and evenings, and service every 2–3 hours during the mid-day.

Stations

Symbols: 
 | - Single-track
 ◇ - Single-track; station where trains can pass

Rolling stock

 E129 series 2/4-car EMUs (since March 2015)

New E129 series EMUs were introduced on local services on the line from fiscal 2014.

Former
 115-500 series 2 car EMUs (until March 2015)
 115-1000 series 3-car EMUs (until 11 March 2022)
 E127 series 2-car EMUs (from March 2015 to 11 March 2022)

History
The Echigo Railway opened the Yahiko to Yoshida section in 1916 and extended the line to Higashi-Sanjo in 1926. The company was nationalised in 1927.

Freight services ceased in 1960, and the line was electrified in 1984.

Former connecting lines
 Tsubame Station: The Niigata Kotsu opened a 34 km line electrified at 1,500 V DC to Sekiya on the Echigo Line in 1933. Freight services ceased in 1982, and the line closed between 1993 and 1999.
 Higashi-Sanjo station: An 8 km line to Echigo Nagasawa operated between 1927 and 1985.

References

External links
 Yahiko Line stations (JR East) 
 Yahiko Line timetable (JR East) 
 Yahiko Line 

 
Lines of East Japan Railway Company
Rail transport in Niigata Prefecture
1067 mm gauge railways in Japan
Railway lines opened in 1916